All Shook Up is a 2004 American jukebox musical with music from the Elvis Presley songbook and with a book by Joe DiPietro. The musical premiered on Broadway in 2005.

Production history
The musical had a developmental staging at the Goodspeed Musicals May 13-June 6, 2004, with most of the Broadway cast, except for Manley Pope in the lead role of Chad. Christopher Ashley directed, with choreography by Jody Moccia. The musical had a tryout in Chicago at the Cadillac Palace from December 19, 2004, through January 23, 2005. After the tryout, changes were made to the finale and to add "a more specific instrumental and vocal voice" for Chad.  The characters and plot twists in the musical were inspired by William Shakespeare's Much Ado About Nothing, Twelfth Night, As You Like It and A Midsummer Night's Dream.

Broadway
The musical premiered on Broadway at the Palace Theatre on March 24, 2005, and closed on September 25, 2005, after 213 performances and 33 previews. Directed by Christopher Ashley, with choreography by Ken Roberson, the original Broadway cast included Cheyenne Jackson (Chad), Jenn Gambatese (Natalie Haller/"Ed"), and Jonathan Hadary (Jim Haller).

It has been performed in the US at regional theatres, colleges and high schools.

US National tour
The US National tour played 35 cities in September 2006 – 2007, directed by Christopher Ashley, and featuring Joe Mandragona as Chad, and Jenny Fellner as Natalie. Sergio Trujillo revised the choreography for the tour.

"Love Me Tender" - 2015 UK Tour
In 2015, a UK tour of the show commenced at Manchester Opera House in June 2015 with the show being retitled "Love Me Tender". The production starred Mica Paris as 'Sylvia', Sian Reeves as ‘Mayor Matilda Hyde’, Shaun Williamson as ‘Jim’ and Ben Lewis as ‘Chad'.

Synopsis

This synopsis is based on the current licensed version

Act One

Somewhere in the midwest in the 1950s, Chad, a hip-swiveling, guitar-playing roustabout, is being released from prison ("Jailhouse Rock").

In a nearby dreary little town, Natalie, a young mechanic, is dreaming of love and adventure while she yearns for one true love to take her away, but she doesn't realize that her best friend Dennis has a secret crush on her ("Love Me Tender"). Sitting in Sylvia's, the local honky tonk, the whole town sings the blues ("Heartbreak Hotel"). Natalie's widowed father Jim enters and joins in, until they're interrupted by the roar of a motorcycle: it is Chad ("Roustabout"). Chad is in need of a mechanic and he's introduced to Natalie, who is instantly smitten ("One Night With You") and promises to fix his broken down bike.

Chad inquires about excitement in the town, and soon discovers the Mamie Eisenhower Decency Act, outlawing "Loud music, public necking, and tight pants." Chad then seeks to incite some rebelliousness in the citizens ("C'mon Everybody"). While Natalie fixes Chad's motorbike, Chad seeks to inspire her to take to the open road ("Follow That Dream").

After Chad exits, Natalie, in an attempt to look more attractive to Chad, puts on the only dress she owns—a tattered old one she uses to clean car engines. Chad asks Dennis to become his sidekick and Dennis accepts. Soon, glamorous Sandra appears, and Chad is instantly in love with the museum owner ("One Night With You" —reprise). Chad tries to smooth-talk her, but she resists ("Teddy Bear/Hound Dog").

Later that day, at Sylvia's Honky Tonk, Natalie enters in her greasy dress, and Lorraine has her change into one of her dresses—it is clean and cute and Natalie looks lovely. She rushes off in pursuit of Chad. When Sandra enters, and Jim also falls for her, even after having just agreed upon the benefits of being alone in life with Sylvia ("One Night With You"—reprise).

Dean, the son of Mayor Matilda, enters to tell Lorraine that he thinks she's beautiful. Lorraine is thrilled. Chad then convinces them that they would be a "sweet little couple" ("That's All Right"). But Sylvia interrupts, and Dean rushes out. Later that evening, Dean tells her the terrible news: they're about to be separated, his mother having just told him he's being sent back to military academy. Hopelessly in love, Dean and Lorraine decide to run off together ("It's Now Or Never").

Chad, Dennis and Natalie later meet at her garage, but Chad is soon distracted by the appearance of Sandra, trying to sing to  her, but it doesn't work. Natalie is intrigued by Dennis' new hunting cap, and comes up with the idea of dressing like a Chad-like figure to become "one of the guys".

As Chad bemoans Sandra's lack of attraction to him Dennis comes up with an idea. He volunteers to take a Shakespearean sonnet to her. Chad agrees. But before Dennis leaves, a leather-jacketed roustabout rides into town ("Blue Suede Shoes"). It is Natalie, dressed as 'Ed'. Chad is excited, and he immediately asks Ed to be his new sidekick. After a short argument between Dennis and an out-of-character Ed, Dennis agrees. Jim then suddenly enters, and for fear of being recognised by his/her own father, Natalie/Ed then rushes off.

Jim tells Chad that he's in love with a woman who doesn't love him back. Chad then gives Jim a much-needed lesson in coolness ("Don't Be Cruel").

Ed arrives at the museum and gives Sandra the sonnet. Sandra is so moved by the sonnet that she finds herself drawn to this strange-looking young man ("One Night With You"—reprise). Ed tries to leave, but Sandra is intent on seducing him ("Let Yourself Go").

Mayor Matilda is cracking down on the immoral behaviour that is now running rampant through the town. She comes upon a couple kissing, and she's stunned to see that it's her precious Dean kissing Lorraine.  Dean and Lorraine run off into the night. Matilda promises to throw Chad in jail for what he has done. Ed tells Chad that in order to avoid jail, he should hide in the abandoned fairgrounds just outside town. Chad runs off, and Ed runs off after him. Jim, now dressed like Chad, enters and asks Sylvia if she's seen Sandra. Sylvia tells Jim that he's crazy to fall for a woman like that, and Jim admonishes Sylvia for having grown cold and bitter. Jim gives Sylvia a very surprising kiss, and a stunned Sylvia suddenly falls for him. Soon, everyone in town find themselves escaping to the fairgrounds, searching for someone to love ("Can't Help Falling in Love").

Act Two

In the midst of the abandoned fairgrounds, the citizens of the town are restless and randy ("All Shook Up"). Dennis comes upon Natalie, who's still dressed as Ed, and Dennis reveals that he's upset about the way Chad treats her ("It Hurts Me"). But Natalie insists that Chad is the only guy for her.

In an attempt to win Chad, Natalie convinces Chad to teach her (as Ed) how to seduce a woman ("A Little Less Conversation") but in the process, Ed winds up kissing Chad. Chad is stunned and Ed runs off as Jim enters. Chad reaffirms his masculinity ("Power Of My Love"). Jim and Chad suddenly realize they are both in love with the same woman. Sandra enters, lustfully looking for Ed. Jim confesses his love for Sandra, but she doesn't even remember meeting him. As the heartbroken Jim slinks off, Ed enters, and after a short argument, Sandra agrees to leave Ed with Chad. Angered with his discovery of Sandra's feelings for Ed, Chad is about to hit him, but he realizes that he can't. Ed gives Chad some "alone time", and Chad realizes that he has feelings for his new sidekick ("I Don't Want To").

In another part of the fairgrounds, Mayor Matilda enters, followed, as always, by the silent Sheriff Earl, and she vows to bring the roustabout down ("Devil In Disguise").

A heartbroken Jim wanders about and runs into Sylvia, who is wearing her best Sunday dress. He wonders what she's doing out there this time of night, and she confesses her newfound feelings for him ("There's Always Me"). Despite the circumstances, Jim can't handle this revelation, and he rushes off.

In another part of the grounds, Dean and Lorraine plan to catch the morning train out of town, but Chad convinces them to stay and fight for their love ("If I Can Dream").

In the centre of the fairgrounds, Matilda gathers the townspeople together to both find her son and arrest Chad. But Chad enters, as does Dean with Lorraine.

Earl speaks for the first time and professes his love for Matilda. In her newfound acceptance of young love, Dean and Lorraine are allowed to be together, and Jim realizes its actually Sylvia that he's loved ("Can't Help Falling In Love -reprise"). Chad confesses his love for Ed, but Ed then takes off his hat and reveals to everyone that he is actually Natalie. Chad leaves the town. Dennis and Sandra realize a common love for Shakespeare and subsequently fall in love with each other ("One Night With You"—reprise).

Left alone with her father, Natalie sings of her falling in love with Chad ("Fools Fall In Love").

The last scene is a triple wedding (Jim and Sylvia, Matilda and Earl, Dennis and Sandra), with flower girl/bridesmaid Lorraine. Chad interrupts the wedding and declares his love for Natalie, though Natalie decides not to marry him and hit the open road. However, after some persuasion, Natalie agrees to make Chad her sidekick. The brides and grooms marry and everyone celebrates falling in love ("Burning Love").

Characters
Source:

 Chad: a great-looking, motorcycling, guitar-playing, leather-jacketed roustabout. 
 Natalie Haller (Early 20s): a mechanic.
 Dennis: a young, quirky, and awkward, aspiring dentist. 
 Jim Haller: Natalie's widowed father. 
 Sylvia: the no-nonsense,  owner of Sylvia's Honky-Tonk. 
 Miss Sandra: the beautiful, intellectual caretaker of the town's museum.
 Lorraine: Sylvia's 16-year-old daughter.
 Mayor Matilda Hyde (mid 40s-50s): the town's conservative mayor.
 Sheriff Earl (mid 40s-50s): the law in town. A man of not many words. 
 Dean Hyde: Matilda's 16-year-old son. He has grown up at a military boarding school 
Henrietta: Regular at Sylvia's Honky-Tonk 
Ensemble
Female Customer
Female Clerk
Bus Driver
Warden
Fella
Guys #1 & #2
Barflies

Song list

Act I
"Jailhouse Rock" - Chad and Prisoners (Music and lyrics by Jerry Leiber and Mike Stoller)
"Love Me Tender" - Natalie and Dennis (Music and Lyrics By Elvis Presley and Vera Matson)
"Heartbreak Hotel" - Henrietta, Dennis, Sylvia, Lorraine, Jim and Barflies (Music and lyrics by Presley, Mae Boren Axton and Tommy Durden)
"Roustabout" - Chad (Music and lyrics by Florence Kaye, Bernie Baum and Bill Giant)
"One Night With You" - Natalie (Music and lyrics by Pearl King and Dave Bartholomew)
"C'mon Everybody" - Chad, Natalie, Dennis, and Company (Music and lyrics by Joy Byers)
"Follow That Dream" - Chad and Natalie (Lyrics by Fred Wise, music by Ben Weisman)
"Teddy Bear/Hound Dog"  - Chad, Miss Sandra, Dennis and Natalie (Music and lyrics by Kal Mann and Bernie Lowe/Leiber and Stoller)
"That's All Right" - Sylvia, Lorraine, Chad, Dennis, Dean and Barflies (Music and lyrics by Arthur Crudup)
"It's Now or Never" - Dean, Lorraine and Company (Music and lyrics by Aaron Schroeder and Wally Gold)
"Blue Suede Shoes" - Ed and Chad (Music and lyrics by Carl Perkins)
"Don't Be Cruel" - Chad and Jim (Music and lyrics by Presley and Otis Blackwell)
"Let Yourself Go" - Miss Sandra and Statues (Music and lyrics by Joy Byers)
"Can't Help Falling In Love" - Company (Music and Lyrics by Hugo Peretti, Luigi Creatore, George David Weiss)

Act II
 Entr'acte
"All Shook Up" - Company (Music and lyrics by Presley and Blackwell)
"It Hurts Me" - Dennis and Company (Music and lyrics by Byers and Charlie Daniels)
"A Little Less Conversation" - Ed and Company (Music and lyrics by Mac Davis and Billy Strange)
"The Power of My Love" - Chad, Jim and Miss Sandra (Music and lyrics by Giant, Baum and Kaye)
"I Don't Want To" (from Girls! Girls! Girls!) - Chad (Lyrics by Janice Torre, music by Fred Spielman)
"(You're the) Devil in Disguise" - Mayor Matilda and Ladies Church Council (Music and lyrics by Giant, Baum and Kaye)
"There's Always Me" - Sylvia (Music and lyrics by Don Robertson)
"If I Can Dream" - Chad, Lorraine, Dean and Company (Music and lyrics by  W. Earl Brown)
"Can't Help Falling in Love" (Reprise)  - Earl, Jim, Sylvia and Matilda
"Fools Fall In Love" - Natalie and Company (Music and Lyrics By Leiber and Stoller)
Burning Love - Company (Music and lyrics by Dennis Linde)

Instrumentation
The original Broadway production had fifteen musicians, including the musical director and associate conductor. The original production was scored for two keyboards, two guitars, electric bass, drums, percussion, four woodwinds, three trumpets, and trombone. The first keyboard part was played by the conductor and the second keyboard part also doubled on organ. The first woodwind part doubled on piccolo, flute, clarinet, and alto sax; the second on flute, clarinet, and alto sax; the third on clarinet and tenor sax; the fourth on bass clarinet and baritone sax. There were also three trumpets where the first trumpet is the lead trumpet. The trumpets also doubled on flugelhorn.

The orchestration that is under the current license is based on the national tour version; there are only twelve musicians. The percussion part is removed, there are now three woodwind parts, and two trumpets. The rest remain the same. This time the first woodwind part doubles on flute and alto sax; the second on clarinet and tenor sax; the third on bass clarinet and baritone sax.

Original Broadway production

Recording
The Original Broadway cast recording was released on May 31, 2005, by BMG Marketing.

Controversy
The musical was the source of a minor controversy when students put it on at Herriman High School in Utah. After discussion, the play was allowed to go on after "minor edits to Presley’s songs and scene changes" to reduce its sexuality.

See also
For other plays relating to Elvis Presley, see also Cooking with Elvis.

References

External links
Internet Broadway Database listing
All Shook Up plot summary and character descriptions at StageAgent.com
New York Times review, March 25, 2005
All Shook Up Music Tracks on Masterworks Broadway

Broadway musicals
2005 musicals
Jukebox musicals
Musicals based on plays
Plays and musicals based on Twelfth Night